Public Atorni: Asunto o Areglo is a Philippine television court show broadcast by TV5 in the Philippines in which small claims court cases are heard, through Mediation. Its format is similar to US television court shows such as Judge Judy and The People's Court; however, instead of a former judge, the chief of the Philippines' Public Attorney's Office is the mediator. It is presented by MJ Marfori while the cases are mediated by Public Attorney's Office chief, Atty. Persida Rueda-Acosta.

Format
The show starts with a brief explanation of the Alternative dispute resolution. Like a typical court (or in this case, mediation/arbitration), there are two parties, the complainant and the respondent. The mediation starts when Atty. Persida Rueda-Acosta explains the process of mediation. The two parties need to tell the truth, just like litigants in a real trial court. Every party has to tell their side of the story or show evidences that will help their case. Atty. Acosta then explains legal perspective of the issue/s the parties raised and the consequences that will happen if this happens. Then, she'll ask each party "Asunto o Areglo?" (To Sue or To Settle?). If they pick areglo, they need to settle the issue or both parties will a compromise agreement to resolve the issue. They must follow the agreement or they will be sued for disobeying the agreement. If the parties chose asunto, their complaints will be sent to a trial court.

See also
News5 
List of programs broadcast by TV5 
List of programs broadcast by AksyonTV

TV5 (Philippine TV network) original programming
Philippine legal television series
2010 Philippine television series debuts
2014 Philippine television series endings
Court shows
Filipino-language television shows